Cheniu  (Eastern Han Chinese: *tśʰa-ṇuB ) was chieftain of the Goulong clan and chanyu of the Southern Xiongnu from 142 to 143 AD.

In 140 AD, Xiongnu chiefs, Cheniu, Wusi, and Yiti rebelled. They led 8,000 men in raids across the northern Ordos region and attacked the Southern Xiongnu capital of Meiji. Han General Ma Xu repelled them with 20,000 men.

In 142 AD, the Southern Xiongnu Chanyu Xiuli committed suicide. Cheniu claimed the title of chanyu and his followers, now in the tens of thousands, attacked across the northern frontier into Han territory. However, Han forces under Zhang Dan retaliated in force and handed out several defeats on the rebel Xiongnu. By 143 AD, Cheniu had surrendered and Wusi was killed. The title of chanyu went to the hostage prince, Doulouchu, held captive at the Han court.

Footnotes

References

Bichurin N.Ya., "Collection of information on peoples in Central Asia in ancient times", vol. 1, Sankt Petersburg, 1851, reprint Moscow-Leningrad, 1950

Taskin B.S., "Materials on Sünnu history", Science, Moscow, 1968, p. 31 (In Russian)

Chanyus